Louis Bennett II (born May 19, 1995) is an American professional soccer player who currently plays as a defender for Chicago House AC in the National Independent Soccer Association.

Career

Early career
Bennett played college soccer at Marquette University from 2013 and 2015. While at college, Bennett II played with Premier Development League side Chicago Fire U-23.

Professional
Bennett opted to forgo his senior college season to sign a three-year deal with Cypriot side Anorthosis Famagusta on August 12, 2016.

Bennett returned to the United States on February 17, 2017, when he signed with United Soccer League side Swope Park Rangers.

Personal
Bennett is the son of former soccer player Louis Bennett, who is currently the head coach at Marquette University. Bennett II has dual American-British citizenship.

References

1995 births
Living people
American soccer players
American expatriate soccer players
American expatriate sportspeople in Cyprus
American expatriate sportspeople in the Czech Republic
Anorthosis Famagusta F.C. players
Association football midfielders
Chicago Fire U-23 players
Expatriate footballers in Cyprus
Expatriate footballers in the Czech Republic
Forward Madison FC players
Marquette Golden Eagles men's soccer players
Memphis 901 FC players
People from Shorewood, Wisconsin
Soccer players from Wisconsin
Sporting Kansas City II players
Sportspeople from the Milwaukee metropolitan area
USL Championship players
USL League Two players